Bis(diphenylphosphinoethyl)phenylphosphine is the organophosphorus compound with the formula [Ph2PCH2CH2]2PPh (Ph = C6H5).  It is an air-sensitive white solid that function as tridentate ligands in coordination and organometallic chemistry.

It is prepared by the free-radical-catalysed addition of phenylphosphine to vinyldiphenylphosphine:
2 Ph2PCH=CH2  +  H2PPh   →   [Ph2PCH2CH2]2PPh
It can bind to an octahedral metal center give either a facial or meridional isomers.  Some derivatives are square planar complexes of the type [MX(triphos)]+ (M = Ni, Pd, Pt; X = halide).

Related ligands
diethylenetriamine (HN(CH2CH2NH2)2)
bis(diphenylphosphinophenyl)phenylphosphine (PhP(C6H4PPh2)2)
1,1,1-Tris(diphenylphosphinomethyl)ethane, a tripodal ligand.

References

Tertiary phosphines
Phenyl compounds
Chelating agents
Tridentate ligands